Thomas Leslie Holling (1889–1966) was mayor of the City of Buffalo, New York, serving 1938–1941. He was born April 23, 1889, in Bad Axe, Michigan. He grew up in Wyoming, Ontario, moving to Buffalo in 1906, and learned the printing business. He started his own printing business in 1911, the Holling Press. In 1924, the company opened a new 10-story plant at 501 Washington Street. On June 14, 1910, he married Mary Lenhard; she died in 1955 and he remarried the following year to Helen Busch Steele in St. Petersburg, Florida.

He was elected mayor on November 2, 1937, as the Democratic candidate. During his term, the Lakeview and Willert Park housing projects were developed. Also constructed was the Kleinhans Music Hall and Buffalo Memorial Auditorium.  After completing his single term, he returned to private life. In 1945, he received the Democratic nomination for mayor, but was defeated in the election by the Republican candidate Bernard J. Dowd. In early May 1946, Holling was one of several possible candidates in consideration for the post of governor of Puerto Rico. He died on November 25, 1966, in his home in Redington Beach, Florida, and was buried in Mount Calvary Cemetery in Cheektowaga, New York.

References

1889 births
1966 deaths
Mayors of Buffalo, New York
20th-century American politicians
People from Bad Axe, Michigan
People from Pinellas County, Florida
People from Wyoming, Ohio